Kandi Technologies Group, Inc. is a Chinese battery and electric vehicle manufacturer. Kandi is listed  on the NASDAQ stock exchange with  ticker KNDI. It was founded  in 2002 in Jinhua, Zhejiang by Hu Xiaoming.

History

Kandi partnership with Geely
In February 2013, Kandi and Geely subsidiary Shanghai Maple announced the establishment of a 50:50 electric vehicle joint venture, Zhejiang Kandi Electric Vehicles Investment, with an initial registered capital of 1 billion yuan (US$160 million). The joint venture is planned to focus on the research and development, production, marketing and sale of electric vehicles on the Chinese mainland. The joint venture agreement was signed on 22 March 2013. Mr. Shufu Li, Chairman of Geely Auto will be appointed to be the first Chairman of the JV Company and Mr. Xiaoming Hu, Chairman & CEO of Kandi will be appointed to be the first General Manager.

In 2016, Geely Auto sold its half of the JV to Geely Holding Group, controlled by Li Shufu.

Kandi has partnered up with Geely to sell EVs under the Gleagle brand. Kandi remains one of Geely Auto's strategic partners in China focused on pure electric vehicle manufacturing. Under the strategic partnership the EX3 is born, Geely provides the EV designs and Kandi provides the EV manufacturing resources.

EV CarShare 
In July 2012, Kandi Technologies signed a strategic cooperation agreement with the city of Hangzhou to supply 20,000 electric vehicles for the city's pilot electric vehicle leasing program.

The Kandi public EV CarShare concept is based on Hangzhou's bikeshare, the largest bikeshare in the world and the first of its kind in China. The bikeshare has since spread from Hangzhou to 19 Chinese cities including Shanghai and Beijing. To date, Kandi has delivered over 40,000 car share EVs making it by far, the world's largest car share program.

Kandi's original plan was to build with both Government and “outside” support, 750 of these garages through a 50-50 joint venture with Geely Automotive, China's largest passenger automaker, which would require some 100,000 Kandi electric vehicles to stock them. This model is slated to spread to other cities and regions like Shanghai, Shandong, and Hainan. Six garages were completed, but due to escalating real estate prices,  vertical garages have halted in favor of horizontal street parking type kiosks.

United States expansion 
In 2019, the company announced plans to expand its market to the United States, as the U.S. National Highway Traffic Safety Administration (NHTSA) approved its Model EX3 and Model K22 cars to be exported into the U.S.

The company shipped 50–100 EVs to the United States at end of May/early June 2019.

In July 2020, Kandi announced that it would be starting sales in Summer 2020 in the Dallas-Fort Worth Area of Texas and released details of the first two cars to hit the market: the Kandi K27 and K23 models.

Other developments 
On November 30, 2020, Hindenburg Research a short selling group released a report blaming Kandi of a scheme in which they were faking its sales by at least 55%.

On December 7, Kandi's chairman released a response addressing Hindenburg's short seller report. Kandi replied to the report with a statement claiming that: "Kandi believes that the report contains numerous errors, misstatements of historical facts, inaccurate conclusions, and superfluous opinions."

Kandi has acquired battery technology company Jinhua An Kao. Jinhua An Kao has designed a unique system of pure electric car battery replacement technologies including an intelligent constant-temperature charging station, a 50-100 channel intelligent battery charging system, a car battery replacement tool, and a car washing machine. Jinhua An Kao currently has 22 patents that have either been accepted by the PRC State Intellectual Property Offices for application or are currently in the application process. It has more than 10 utility model and design patents. Additionally, Jinhua An Kao owns three invention patents and 14 utility model patents relating to plug-in and soft-connection PACK technology.

In 2018, Kandi transitioned into longer-range electric vehicles with the K23 and EX3 models. One of the things that the company is claiming is that these SUV crossover hybrids have more cargo room from its other offerings.

Kandi acquired Sportsman Country LLC for $10 million in June 2018.  Sportsman Country will facilitate the dealer relationships for Kandi's EX3 electric vehicles.

Jiangsu Development and Reform Commission approved Kandi with one of three EV manufacturing licenses. The applicants pool consisted of EV enterprises from nationwide. EVs qualify for subsidies offered by China's central and local governments, on an average of $10,000 per vehicle. EVs are waived from Chinese megacities' license plate fees that apply to ICE vehicles, on an average of $14,000 per license plate.

Kandi had low sales of EV in first quarter of 2019 due to delay of government subsidies and restructuring of the JV. They planned to ramp up production for the remaining portion of 2019 and have a non-binding framework agreement with DIDI to deliver 300,000 EVs over the next five years.

Products

EX3 (previously K26)
The EX3 debuted on November 1, 2017, as Kandi's first SUV. It was first exhibited at a launch event on March 26, 2018. Being the electric version of the Geely Vision X3, it is approved for China's tax exemption on new energy vehicles.

The EX3 SUV qualifies for the full $7,500 U.S. Federal Tax Credit, with its starting price being $29,995.

K17A

K17A debuted on August 5, 2016. The K17A is Kandi's first EV.

K23
K23's production started at the Hainan facility on March 28, 2018. It can be fully charged in 7.5 hours at a standard Level 2, 240 volt, 32 amp charging station. Its top speed is theoretically , but artificially restricted to just  in the US market, depending upon the state in which it is sold.

K27

The K27 is a minimal compact four-door BEV that seats four. It can be fully charged in seven hours at a standard Level 2, 240 volt, 16 amp charging station.

The K27 is marketed by Kandi as being the least expensive EV available in the US, and after incentives available in some states it can potentially cost less than $10,000. With a list price of $17,499 ($15,499 after federal tax credits), however, prior to state rebates it is still significantly more expensive than the cheapest car sold in the US market, the Chevrolet Spark, which lists for $14,395.

K32
The Kandi K32 is based on the same vehicle body as the Foday Lion F22 pickup truck, and was marketed as an all-electric dual motor 4-wheel drive UTV which is not legal for use on public roads. The K32 was introduced in November 2021. Top speed is claimed to be . Both models are equipped with a dual-motor, all-wheel-drive powertrain an output of  according to Kandi.

Sales
A total of 1,215 Kandi EVs were sold in China during the first quarter of 2014, and an additional 4,114 during the second quarter, representing a growth of 238%, and total sales of 5,329 units during first half of 2014.
Kandi EV city car, had a price tag of 41,517 yuan ($6,317) in 2015. The China Association of Automobile Manufacturers (CAAM) reported the sale of 16,376 Kandi EVs in 2015. The government has set expectations high for the growth of the electric car market. The plan is to have five million electric and hybrid vehicles on the roads in China by 2020.
2015 sales revenue relies heavily on government subsidies. Chinese government choose not to issue subsidies to Kandi in 2015, while its third 2015 subsidy payment completed on April 21, 2017.

Kandi secured US$105.8 million financing through the National Economic and Technological Development Zone of Rugao City in May 2017.

Kandi EV Car Share
The Kandi EV Car Share is a carsharing program in the city of Hangzhou. The system operates only with Kandi EV all-electric cars, which are available to customers in automated garages that run like vending machines. Then, Kandi recharges the batteries at its convenience. The leasing option, called "Long Lease,"  is available from 1- to 3-year contracts.

Kandi Technologies plans on making 100,000 cars available to the residents of Hangzhou over the two years. It is also planning to expand into 2–3 other Chinese cities during 2014.

In 2019, Kandi Technologies signed a non-binding framework with a ride-sharing alliance to provide 300,000 EVs within 5 years.

Executing its commitment to ride-sharing, Kandi JV signs a non-binding agreement with Cao Cao Zhuan Che as the supplier for 20,000 electric vehicles.

References

External links

 

Car manufacturers of China
Electric vehicle manufacturers of China
Companies based in Zhejiang
Kandi EV CarShare
Companies listed on the Nasdaq
Production electric cars